The Association of Colombian-Caribbean American Schools (ACCAS) is one of the three regional associations affiliated with the Tri-Association.  Its membership of 21 schools supports the continuation of an American education in the Caribbean region and Colombia.  The organization's focus is on school improvement, encouraging an ongoing program of staff development and teacher and student interactions. New members must be either US-accredited institutions or candidates for accreditation.

History
ACCAS was founded in 1961 by five directors of schools in Colombia:
David Bjork, Colegio Nueva Granada, Bogotá
Dale Swall, Colegio Bolivar, Cali
Nancy Davidson, Columbus School, Medellín
Walter Jarvis, Colegio Karl C. Parrish, Barranquilla
Helen Wallace, Colegio Jorge Washington, Cartagena

At this stage of its history, the Caribbean region was not included in the Association.

In 1963 Colegio Panamericana was founded in Bucaramanga and joined the Association soon thereafter.

The early list of presidents of ACCAS includes:
1961 David Bjork, Colegio Nueva Granada, Bogotá
1963 Raymond Mosley, Columbus School, Medellín
1965 James Baker, Colegio Nueva Granada, Bogotá
1967 Burton Fox, Colegio Karl C. Parrish, Barranquilla

Principal activities in early days included student interchanges in athletics, speech and similar extra curricular programs, all within the boundaries of Colombia. Frequently inexpensive travel via Avianca Airlines was greatly beneficial in this period.

In 1966 a contract was initiated with the University of Alabama, the Office of Overseas Schools and ACCAS. The objective was to deliver Masters and Doctorate degrees for faculty and administrators employed in the ACCAS schools.

Over the next seven years a large number of M.A.’s and Ph.D.’s came out of this program. The signators to the agreement were: Dr. Ernest N. Mannino, Director, A/OS; Dr. Merlin Duncan, REO, A/OS; Dean Robert Bills, The University of Alabama; Dr. Burton Fox, V.P. for ACCAS.

In 1967, A/OS requested Dr. Fox to visit the Priory School, Kingston, Jamaica; Union School, Port-au-Prince, Haiti; and the Carol Morgan School, Santo Domingo, Dominican Republic and explore ways to include these three schools in regional activities. This and subsequent visits resulted in the Union School, (Director, Marie Bogat) and the Carol Morgan School (Director, Roscoe Crowell) joining the Association. The Priory School under Founder and Headmaster, Henry Fowler, joined the following year.

At this time, the name of the Association was changed to the ASSOCIATION OF COLOMBIA-CARIBBEAN AMERICAN SCHOOLS. Soon afterward the first dues were charged: $25 per school per year.

References

Education in the Caribbean
Educational organizations based in South America
1961 establishments in Colombia
Organizations established in 1961